David Martinetti (born 22 June 1970) is a Swiss wrestler. He competed in the men's Greco-Roman 82 kg at the 1992 Summer Olympics.

References

External links
 

1970 births
Living people
Swiss male sport wrestlers
Olympic wrestlers of Switzerland
Wrestlers at the 1992 Summer Olympics
Place of birth missing (living people)